Valimar may refer to:

 Valimar (or Valmar) the capital of Valinor, a fictional location in J. R. R. Tolkien's Middle-earth
 a Divine Knight character in the The Legend of Heroes: Trails of Cold Steel video game
 Baron Valimar Mordis, a character in the Warcraft: The Sunwell Trilogy manga comic

See also
 Valmar (disambiguation)
 Valamir, Roman king